Margaret Urban Walker (born August 8, 1948), is the Donald J. Schuenke Chair Emerita in Philosophy at Marquette University. Before her appointment at Marquette, she was the Lincoln Professor of Ethics at Arizona State University, and before that she was at Fordham University.  She has also previously held visiting appointments at Washington University in St. Louis, University of South Florida, and Catholic University of Leuven.

In 2002, Walker was awarded the Cardinal Mercier chair at the Catholic University of Leuven, and was the first woman ever to hold the chair.

Education and career
Walker (born Margaret Urban) received her bachelor's in philosophy from the University of Illinois at Chicago in 1969. She went on to receive her master's in philosophy from Northwestern University in 1971, and her doctorate in philosophy, also from Northwestern, in 1975.

Walker was a member of the Philosophy Department at Fordham University for 28 years before moving to Arizona State University from 2002 to 2010 (where she received the Defining Edge Research in the Humanities Award in 2007), and moving to Marquette University in 2010. She retired in May 2017. She held visiting appointments at Washington University in St. Louis, the University of South Florida, and the Catholic University of Leuven.  During her second visiting appointment at the Catholic University of Leuven, she was the first woman to hold the Cardinal Mercier Chair in Philosophy.  She also was a Laurance S. Rockefeller Fellow at Princeton University's Center for Human Values from 2003 to 2004.

Research areas
Walker's recent research has focused on repairing moral relations after wrongdoing, especially in relation to political violence. She has contributed to research projects with the International Center for Transitional Justice on gender and reparations and truth commissions. She was drawn to this area through her earlier work, in which she focused on the effects of social inequalities on the way morality is understood in ethics and everyday life. Some of her earlier research focused on developing a social differences-focused approach to ethical theory. She strongly defends the view that although moral understandings are inextricably linked to the historical and social practices that they derived from, that those historical and social practices not only can be, but must be critically assessed.

Publications

Books 
Walker has authored seven books, numerous book chapters, and a large number of papers.

Book chapters

Journal articles 
From 2005 to 2010, Walker served as an associate editor of Hypatia: A Journal of Feminist Philosophy.  She served as series co-editor of Feminist Constructions, a 25-volume series of books released between 2002 and 2007.  She co-edited the annual volume of the Association of Feminist Ethics and Social Theory from 2003 to 2005.

References

1948 births
American women philosophers
Feminist philosophers
Northwestern University alumni
Marquette University faculty
Moral psychology
20th-century American philosophers
21st-century American philosophers
American ethicists
Living people
Catholic feminists
20th-century American women
21st-century American women
Arizona State University faculty
Fordham University faculty
Washington University in St. Louis faculty
Princeton University fellows